This is a list of schools in Gibraltar. Gibraltar has fifteen state schools (eight first schools, six middle schools and two comprehensive schools), one MOD school, two private schools and one language school.

Primary schools
 Governor's Meadow First School
 Hebrew Primary School
 Notre Dame First School and Nursery
 St Bernard's First School and Nursery
 St Joseph's First School and Nursery
 St Mary's First School
 St Paul's First School and Nursery

Middle schools
 Bishop Fitzgerald School
 Gibraltar Hebrew School
 Sacred Heart Middle School
 St Anne's Middle School
 St Joseph's Middle School

State secondary schools
 Bayside Comprehensive School (formerly boys - now co-educational)
 Westside School (formerly girls - now co-educational)

Special schools

 St Martin's Special School

Independent schools
 Loreto Convent School (co-ed, nursery to age 12)
 Prior Park School (co-ed, ages 12–18)

Language schools 
  Little English

Former schools
Christian Brothers School
Gibraltar Public School
Brympton Preparatory School

See also

 Education in Gibraltar
 Gibraltar College

References

External links

 gibraltar.gov.gi

 
Education in Gibraltar
Schools
Gibraltar